Liptena helena, the red-spot false dots, is a butterfly in the family Lycaenidae. The species was first described by Hamilton Herbert Druce in 1888. It is found in Guinea, Sierra Leone, Liberia, Ivory Coast and Ghana. The habitat consists of forests.

References

Butterflies described in 1888
Liptena
Butterflies of Africa
Taxa named by Hamilton Herbert Druce